Oligia rampartensis is a species of cutworm or dart moth in the family Noctuidae first described by William Barnes and Foster Hendrickson Benjamin in 1923. It is found in North America.

The MONA or Hodges number for Oligia rampartensis is 9414.1.

References

Further reading

 
 
 

Oligia
Articles created by Qbugbot
Moths described in 1923